Pseudopostega tanygnatha is a moth of the family Opostegidae. It was described by Donald R. Davis and Jonas R. Stonis, 2007. It is known from north-western Costa Rica

The length of the forewings is about 2.3 mm. Adults have been recorded in June.

Etymology
The species name is derived from the Greek tany (meaning long) and gnathos (meaning jaw) in reference to the slender, greatly elongated caudal lobe of the male gnathos.

References

Opostegidae
Moths described in 2007